Mohamed Gamil El-Zobair (date of birth unknown; died 2 September 1983) was an Egyptian footballer. He competed in the men's tournament at the 1928 Summer Olympics.

References

External links
 

Year of birth missing
1983 deaths
Egyptian footballers
Egypt international footballers
Olympic footballers of Egypt
Footballers at the 1928 Summer Olympics
Association football forwards
Al Ahly SC players